Rituals is a 1980 novel by Dutch writer Cees Nooteboom. 

The novel's narrative follows two friends, one who breaks rules frequently and one who follows them strictly. It was Nooteboom's first novel in 17 years. After finishing The Knight Has Died (1963), he had worked as a journalist, written poetry, and traveled around the world, "looking for something to write about".

Rituals won the Ferdinand Bordewijk Prize and the Pegasus Prize. It was published in an English translation in 1983 by Louisiana State University Press, which also published English translations of other works by Nooteboom through 1990. 

The novel was adapted as a 1988 French-language film with the same title, directed by Herbert Curiel.

Plot summary

Reception 
The novel was praised by critics. It won the Ferdinand Bordewijk Prize and the Pegasus Prize.

Adaptations 
 A 1988 French-language feature film by the same title was adapted from this novel. It was directed by Herbert Curiel. and starred Derek de Lint.

See also 
 1980 in literature
 Dutch literature

References 

1980 novels
20th-century Dutch novels
Dutch-language novels
Novels by Cees Nooteboom
Dutch novels adapted into films